Dor (also Romanized as Dar or Dorr; also known as Dowr and Durr) is a village in Nivan Rural District, in the Central District of Golpayegan County, Isfahan Province, Iran. At the 2006 census, its population was 396, in 171 families. It is at a Latitude of 33.283333° and a Longitude of 50.633333°.

References 

Populated places in Golpayegan County